The 2013 Campeonato da Primeira Divisão de Futebol Profissional da FGF, better known as the 2013 Campeonato Gaúcho, was the 93rd season of Rio Grande do Sul's top-flight football league. The season began on 19 January and ended on 5 May.

Format
The sixteen clubs were divided into two groups. In the first stage, called Taça Piratini 2013, teams played against teams from the other group. In the second stage, called Taça Farroupilha 2013, clubs play teams from their own group. In both stages, the top four teams from each group qualified to the play-offs. The winners of each stage play off for the overall title. The bottom three teams in the overall standings will be relegated.

Teams

Taça Piratini

First stage

Group A standings

Group B standings

Playoffs

Taça Farroupilha

First stage

Group A standings

Group B standings

Playoffs

Tournament finals
Internacional won both Taças.

Overall table
The overall table considers only the matches played during the first stage of both Taças and will define the two teams that will be relegated to play lower levels in 2014. The Taça Champions are placed on the top of the table. The best placed team not playing in Campeonato Brasileiro Série A  (Grêmio, Internacional), B or C (Caxias) will be "promoted" to 2013 Campeonato Brasileiro Série D. The best three teams not qualified to 2014 Copa Libertadores will qualify for 2014 Copa do Brasil.

See also
2013 Copa FGF

References

External links
Federação Gaúcha de Futebol

Campeonato Gaúcho seasons
Gaucho